Dong-Kyun Yum (Hangul: 염동균, Hanja: 廉東均) (born November 10, 1950 in Okcheon, Chungcheongbuk-do) is a former professional boxer from South Korea. He is a former Lineal and WBC junior featherweight champion.

Boxing career
Yum turned professional on March 7, 1970. He became the WBC and Lineal Super Bantamweight champion when he defeated Royal Kobayashi by majority decision over 15 rounds. In the following year, he successfully defended his titles against Jose Cervantes but lost to Wilfredo Gómez in his third title defense.

He retired in 1980 with an impressive record of 53 wins with 21 knockouts, 5 defeats and 8 draws.

See also
List of super bantamweight boxing champions
List of WBA world champions

References

External links
 
Yum Dong-kyun - CBZ Profile

1950 births
Super-bantamweight boxers
Living people
World super-bantamweight boxing champions
World Boxing Council champions
South Korean male boxers
Sportspeople from North Chungcheong Province